The North Halifax Grammar School (NHGS) is a state grammar school, and former specialist Science college (with academy status) in Illingworth, Halifax, West Yorkshire, England.

11+
The school has approximately one thousand students, aged 11 to 18.  NHGS works with Crossley Heath Grammar School to administer an admissions test, admitting 180 students aged 11 each year through an entrance examination which consists of Verbal Reasoning, Mathematics and English tests. 
The examination takes place when students who wish to come to the school begin Year 6, and students are accepted from the top 500 entries the following March. Admissions are accepted between ages 11 and 16 from other schools, with tests in English, Mathematics, Science and Modern Foreign Languages at an appropriate level administered. Admissions at age 16 to the Sixth Form requires high enough GCSE grades but no formal exam.

History 
The Princess Mary High School (which was known as Halifax High School for Girls before 1931) had around 350 girls and was opened on 21 September 1931 by Princess Mary. It became known as the Princess Mary School in 1969 and was situated on Francis Street.  There was a Service of Thanksgiving in July 1985 at the Halifax Parish Church when the school amalgamated with The Highlands School to become North Halifax High School.The buildings remained in use as part of North Halifax High School, though with some facilities used by the Percival Whitley College, until in 1987 all school pupils moved to the former Highlands School site and the buildings were taken over by the College, later becoming part of Halifax New College (which eventually became Calderdale College when it combined with the Halifax School of Integrated Arts).  The site is currently scheduled to be demolished and redeveloped.

The Halifax Technical High School was formed in 1957.  This was before its Moorbottom Road premises were completed and opened in May 1959 by the Vice-Chancellor of the University of Leeds.  It had around 725 boys and girls. It became the Highlands School in 1969.

Amalgamation
The North Halifax High School was formed with the 1985 amalgamation of the Highlands Grammar School and the Princess Mary School. For the first two years of its existence, the new school operated on both sites (though they were four and a half miles apart); it was a matter of policy that (apart from the exam years whose courses obviously could not be disturbed) both sites should have a full age range of pupils, that classes should be mixed, and that all staff as far as possible should do some teaching at both sites. In 1987, when the intake was reduced to four streams (originally Princess Mary had had two, and The Highlands three) the whole school moved to the former Highlands School site. The school was grant-maintained in the early 1990s, being funded directly from the government rather than via the local authority.  Around 1993/4 the school changed its name from North Halifax High School to North Halifax Grammar School (it had been selective before this).  In 1999, the school became a foundation school, giving the governing body ownership of the buildings and site and expanded executive powers.  After a long fundraising campaign, the school achieved Specialist Science College status in 2004, which funded the refurbishment and extension of existing laboratories and the construction of a new one.  The previous headteacher, Graham Maslen, retired in September 2013.

Performance 
The school consistently achieves highly, being one of 19 secondary schools to be rated outstanding in its previous three inspections, before achieving the rating of good in the last inspection.  The school also receives criticism, however, as it is one of the few "highly selective" schools in England taking just the top ten per cent of students based on the results of the Eleven plus exam. Absence is low, with the Department for Education reporting the school's non-authorised absence rate as negligible.

Facilities
The North Halifax Grammar School consists of several different buildings, each of which houses the appropriate facilities for separate subjects. The main and largest building contains 8 English classrooms, 8 Mathematics classrooms, 2 Art classrooms, 2 ICT classrooms, the Gym, the Assembly Hall, the Cafeteria, 2 Music classrooms, 3 Geography classrooms, a Science Block, pastoral offices, a Design & Technology corridor that was renovated during the COVID-19 pandemic, Student Support classrooms for SEND students and a library. Additional buildings include the Graham Maslen Languages Centre, including six classrooms for Modern Foreign Languages and two classrooms for RE & PSHE. There is also the Enderby Wing, which is where three History classrooms can be found. In 2016, NHGS was granted £2.9 million for the construction of a new sports building, which now sits on the upper fields of the school. It has facilities such as a large sports hall, a small gym with new equipment, a dance studio, spacious changing rooms and classrooms available to the public to rent on weekends. There is one set of toilets for males, females and those with disabilities in each building.
Within the school, there is an abundance of outdoor areas for students to stay in during breaktimes and lunchtimes. There is a multi-use games area, known as the MUGA, where students can play football, basketball, netball, and rugby. During the summer, the school's two large fields are open to students in the Upper School. Students who do not wish to play ball games can stay in the East Wing Yard or in the outdoor space surrounding the languages centre or the science block where there are seating areas available.

Sixth Form 
The Sixth Form is the largest in Calderdale, currently offering a large range of academic A-levels.  In 2006, 449 A2 entries were made, with a 98.7% pass rate.  In 2011, the Darwin Sixth Form Learning Centre was completed and finished for use.  It was designed to give the sixth form more space around the school; and houses six brand new classrooms and a much larger common-room alongside a canteen exclusively for Sixth Form students.  A new common-room allowed the school to redevelop the previous space into a new Sixth Form study room with desks and several computers.

Extracurricular activities
Extracurricular activities include rugby league, a cricket team.  In the Upper School students attend Queens Sports Club, Diamonds Gymnastics Club, North Bridge Leisure Centre and Holmfield Mill for Physical Education.

In Sixth Form, students are offered the chance to take part in several other extra-curricular activities, such as the Young Enterprise Company Programme.  Other activities specifically for Sixth Form are Reading Matters, a programme in which students help out by reading with primary school students at the local Whitehill Community Academy and The Duke of Edinburgh's Award Scheme.

Current events
In 2012, a Young Enterprise company from the school, "cloud-nine", won the Cisco Human Networking award for the United Kingdom.

Notable former pupils
 Gary Fellows - Yorkshire cricketer
 Joe Tyler - skier
 Chris Illingworth - pianist
 Emma Williams - actress

The Highlands School
 Julie Kirkbride - Conservative MP for Bromsgrove from 1997–2010, and former Daily Telegraph journalist
 Richard Leishman, Olympic swimmer at the 1992 Olympics - still holds the 100m Butterfly junior record for English schools, set in 1983

The Princess Mary High School
 Phyllis Bentley OBE, novelist - wrote Inheritance
 Stella Robson, Chairman from 1998-2002 of the Northern Sinfonia, Mayor of Darlington from 2005-6

References

External links 
 North Halifax Grammar School website
 NHGS Science College website
 EduBase

Schools in Halifax, West Yorkshire
Grammar schools in Calderdale
Academies in Calderdale
Educational institutions established in 1985
1985 establishments in England